Alisa Andreyevna Fedichkina (FYEH-deech-kee-nah; born 14 February 2002) is a Russian competitive figure skater. She is the 2017 International Cup of Nice champion and has won two silver medals on the ISU Challenger Series. She received a small gold medal for her short program at the 2016 World Junior Championships.

Personal life 
Fedichkina was born on 14 February 2002 in Rostov-on-Don, Russia.

Career 
Fedichkina began skating in 2006 when she was 4 years old. In the 2014–15 season, she qualified for the first time to the Russian Junior Championships and finished 8th.

2015–16 season 
Fedichkina's international debut came in the 2015–16 season. Competing at her first Junior Grand Prix (JGP) assignment, she placed first in the short program, 5th in the free skate, and 4th overall at JGP Riga in August 2015. The following month, she won the silver medal  at JGP Spain after ranking first in the short, second in the free, and obtaining a total score 0.42 less than Japan's Yuna Shiraiwa. Fedichkina's placements gave her the last qualifying spot for the 2015−16 JGP Final.

Competing on the junior level, Fedichkina won gold at the 2015 International Cup of Nice and silver at the 2015 Tallinn Trophy. She placed second in the short, fourth in the free, and fourth overall – 0.53 shy of the bronze medalist – at the 2015−16 JGP Final, held in December in Barcelona, Spain. Later that month, she made her senior national debut, placing 11th at the Russian Championships. In January, Fedichkina won the Russian junior national bronze medal behind Polina Tsurskaya and Maria Sotskova. In March, she was awarded a small gold medal for her short program result at the 2016 World Junior Championships in Debrecen, Hungary. She withdrew one hour before the free skate due to a sprained ankle she incurred in practice.

2016–17 season 
At the 2017 Russian Championships, Fedichkina placed 10th on the senior level and 6th at the junior event. During the season she won two international junior events, 2016 Cup of Nice and 2016 Tallinn Trophy.

2017–18 season 
In October, Fedichkina made her senior debut at the 2017 Cup of Nice where she won the gold medal. In November she competed at her first ISU Challenger Series (CS) event, 2017 CS Tallinn Trophy, where she won the silver medal behind her teammate Stanislava Konstantinova. Two weeks later Fedichkina took her second CS silver medal at the 2017 CS Golden Spin of Zagreb. Again she finished behind Konstantinova.

After the 2018 Russian Figure Skating Championships, where Fedichkina did not compete due to injury, she parted ways with coach Evgeni Rukavicin to join Alexei Mishin's group.

Programs

Competitive highlights 
CS: Challenger Series; JGP: Junior Grand Prix

Detailed results

References

External links
 

Russian female single skaters
2002 births
Living people
Sportspeople from Rostov-on-Don